The men's discus throw at the 2018 IAAF World U20 Championships was held at Ratina Stadium on 14 and 15 July.

Records

Results

Qualification
The qualification round took place on 14 July in two groups, with Group A starting at 09:25 and Group B starting at 10:48. Athletes attaining a mark of at least 60.00 metres ( Q ) or at least the 12 best performers ( q ) qualified for the final.

Final
The final was held on 15 July at 13:41.

References

discus throw
Discus throw at the World Athletics U20 Championships